Viacheslav Platonov (Russian: Вячеслав Платонов; 21 January 1939 – 26 December 2005) was a Russian volleyball player and coach.

Vyacheslav Platonov began his volleyball career playing for the Russian club teams until 1967. 
He coached several clubs, notably Automobilist Leningrad, and achieved major success as a coach of the Russia men's national volleyball team.

Platonov was inducted into the Volleyball Hall of Fame in 2002.

External links
Volleyball Hall of Fame

1939 births
Soviet men's volleyball players
Russian volleyball coaches
2005 deaths
Coaches of Russia men's national volleyball team
Soviet volleyball coaches
Burials at Nikolskoe Cemetery
Herzen University alumni